The Mixe languages are languages of the Mixean branch of the Mixe–Zoquean language family indigenous to southern Mexico. According to a 1995 classification, there are seven of them (including one that is extinct). The four that are spoken in Oaxaca are commonly called Mixe while their two relatives spoken in Veracruz are commonly called "Popoluca", but sometimes also Mixe (these are "Oluta Popoluca" or "Olutec Mixe" and "Sayula Popoluca" or "Sayultec Mixe"). This article is about the Oaxaca Mixe languages, which their speakers call Ayöök, Ayuujk, Ayüük or Ayuhk.

140,000 people reported their language to be "Mixe" in the 2020 census.

Classification
Oaxaca Mixe languages are spoken in the Sierra Mixe of eastern Oaxaca. These four languages are: North Highland Mixe, spoken around Totontepec (the most divergent); South Highland Mixe, spoken around Santa María Tlahuitoltepec, Ayutla and Tamazulapan); Midland Mixe, spoken around Juquila and Zacatepec; and Lowland Mixe, spoken in San Juan Guichicovi (this language is also known as "Isthmus Mixe").

The following classification is from Wichmann (1995:9).

Mixe (Oaxacan Mixean)
 North Highland Mixe (Totontepec)
 South Highland Mixe (Tlahuitoltepec)
 Core (Tlahuitoltepec, Ayutla, Tamazulapan)
 Fringe (Tepuxtepec, Tepantlali, Mixistlán)
 Midland Mixe
 North Midland Mixe (Jaltepec, Puxmetacan, Matamoros, Cotzocón)
 South Midland Mixe (Juquila, Cacalotepec)
 Lowland Mixe (Camotlán, San José El Paraíso / Coatlán, Mazatlán, Guichicovi)

Wichmann (2008) adds Ulterior Mixe as an additional branch:

Mixe
 Totontepec Mixe
 Ulterior Mixe
 Lowland – Midland Mixe – South Highland
 Tlahuitoltepec Mixe
 Lowland–Midland Mixe
 Midland Mixe
 Juquila Mixe
 North Central Mixe
 Lowland Mixe
 Coatlán Mixe
 Isthmus Mixe (Guichicovi)
 Mazatlán Mixe

Phonology
Mixe phonology is complicated and little documented. There is a palatalized series of all consonant phonemes (as in Russian, Polish or Irish) and possibly a fortis/lenis distinction in the plosive series, the recognition of which however is obscured by a tendency towards allophonic voicing of consonants in voiced environments. Syllable nuclei are notoriously complex in Mixe, varying in length and phonation. Most descriptions report three contrastive vowel lengths. There are multiple values of phonation, one being modal voicing. The other types of phonation have been variously termed checked vowels, creaky voice vowels and breathy voice vowels. Some Mixe variants are innovative and some, notably North Highland Mixe, have complicated umlaut systems raising vowel qualities in certain phonological environments.

Grammar

Verbs
The morphosyntactic alignment of Mixe is ergative and it also has an obviative system which serves to distinguish between verb participants in reference to its direct–inverse system. The Mixe verb is complex and inflects for many categories and also shows a lot of derivational morphology. One of the parameters of verb inflection is whether a verb occurs in an independent or dependent clause; this distinction is marked by both differential affixation and stem ablaut. Unlike Sayultec Mixe (spoken in the neighboring state of Veracruz), Mixe languages of Oaxaca only mark one argument on the verb: either the object or the subject of the verb depending on whether the verb is in the direct or inverse form. Mixe shows a wide variety of possibilities for noun incorporation.

Nouns
The Mixe noun does not normally inflect, except that human nouns inflect for plural. Noun compounding is a very productive process, and the profuse derivational morphology allows for creation of new nouns both from verbs and from other nouns. To indicate the plural an enclitic, ëch, is added to the noun.

Syntax
Mixe languages have SOV constituent order, prepositions and genitives precede the noun. But relative clauses follow the noun.

Sample
This sample is from Lowland Mixe:

Radio
Mixe-language programming is carried by the CDI's radio station XEGLO, based in Guelatao de Juárez, Oaxaca.

See also
 Agustín Quintana

Sources

Bibliography
 Dieterman, Julia Irene, 1995, Participant reference in Isthmus Mixe Narrative Discourse, MA. Thesis in linguistics presented to the Faculty of the Graduate school of the University of Texas at Arlington.
 Hoogshagen, Searle & Hilda Halloran Hoogshagen, 1993, Diccionario Mixe de Coatlán, Serie de Vocabularios Indigénas "Mariano Silva y Aceves" Num. 32. SIL, Mexico, D.F.
 Kroeger, Paul R. 2005. Analyzing grammar: an introduction. Cambridge University Press.
 Schoenhals, Alvin & Louise Schoenhals, 1965, Vocabulario Mixe de Totontepec, Serie de Vocabularios Indigénas "Mariano Silva y Aceves" Num. 14. SIL, Mexico, D.F.
 Wichmann, Søren, 1995, The Relationship Among the Mixe–Zoquean Languages of Mexico. University of Utah Press. Salt Lake City. 
 JANY, C. (2013). Defining Nominal Comp as a P WORD-FORMATION PROCESS IN CHUXNABÁN MIXE. International Journal of American Linguistics, 79(4), 533–553.

External links
 Online resources for Mixe of Chuxnabán (Midlands) by Carmen Jany
 Bachillerato bilingüe Mixe de Tlahuitoltepec

Indigenous languages of Mexico
Mesoamerican languages
Mixe–Zoque languages
Articles citing INALI